Zana Allée (born 1 March 1994) is a professional footballer who plays as a midfielder for Championnat National 2 club Rouen. Born in Iraqi Kurdistan, he is a former France youth international.

Career
On 10 August 2013, Allée made his debut with Rennes's first team in a match against Reims. Rennes won the match 2–1 and Zana played 54 minutes.

On 4 August 2015, Allée joined Ajaccio on a two-year contract. Allée made no first team appearances in the second year of his Ajaccio contract, and left to join Concarneau in the January 2017 transfer window. He left at the end of the season, joining his brothers at Stade Briochin in November 2017.

In June 2022, Allée signed for Rouen.

Personal life
Allée's two brothers, Dana and Ahmad, are also footballers.

Career statistics

References

External links
Profile on staderennais.com

1994 births
Living people
Association football midfielders
French footballers
Iraqi footballers
Ligue 1 players
Ligue 2 players
Championnat National players
Championnat National 2 players
Championnat National 3 players
Stade Rennais F.C. players
AC Ajaccio players
AJ Auxerre players
US Concarneau players
Stade Briochin players
FC Rouen players
French people of Iraqi descent
People from Duhok
Kurdish sportspeople
Iraqi emigrants to France
Footballers from Brittany
Sportspeople from Saint-Brieuc